IBTE Nakhoda Ragam Campus, formerly known as Nakhoda Ragam Vocational School (Malay: Sekolah Vokasional Nakhoda Ragam; Malay, abbreviated: SVNR), is one of the technical institute in Bandar Seri Begawan, Brunei. Since 2014, it has been subsumed and fully administered under the Institute of Brunei Technical Education.

Schools and programmes offered
Nakhoda Ragam Campus is home to two Schools, offering Higher National Technical Certificate (HNTec) and National Technical Certificate (NTec) programmes are:

 School of Energy and Engineering Central (Branch):
 HNTec in Electrical Engineering
 NTec in Electrical Technology
 School of Building Technology Services:
 HNTec in Construction & Draughting (Dual TVET)
 HNTec in Geomatics
 HNTec in Real Estate Management & Agency
 NTec in Building Craft

Notes and references

External links
 Institute of Brunei Technical Education
 IBTE on Wiki

Nakhoda Ragam Campus
Educational institutions established in 1970
1970 establishments in Brunei